Verano de Escándalo (Spanish for "Summer of Scandal") is a major annual professional wrestling event in Mexico promoted by the Lucha Libre AAA World Wide (AAA) promotion. The show is as the name indicates a summer show, traditionally held in September. The first show was held in 1997 and since then fifteen events have been held, the more recent ones generally presented on pay-per-view while the early shows were shown as Television specials on the Televisa channel. Verano de Escándalo is the first major show by AAA after their annual Triplemanía event, and generally features storylines or feuds stemming from that event. It is generally seen as the smallest of the five major shows AAA puts together every year. The most recent event was the 2015 event, the seventeenth overall Verano de Escándalo in the series.

Event history
The first Verano de Escándalo event was held on September 14, 1997 and has been held in September 11 out of 13 times, with one event in August (2003) and one in October (2004). All Verano de Escándalo shows have been held in Mexico, with most events, three, being held in Naucalpan, Mexico State. As is tradition with AAA major events the wrestlers compete inside a hexagonal wrestling ring and not the four sided ring the promotion uses for television events and House shows. The highest documentede attendance for a Verano de Escándalo show was 18,500 spectators for the 1997 event. The lowest recorded attendance was 4,021 spectators for the 1999 event.

As of 2015, Verano de Escándalo has seen fourteen Luchas de Apuestas, or bet fights. Two times a wrestler has been unmasked and twelve times a wrestler or wrestlers have hair their hair shaved off as a result of losing the Apusta match. The event has hosted twelve championship matches, with seven championships changing hands. Twice Verano de Escándalo has been host to the final match of a tournament to establish a new AAA Championship, in 2007 the first ever AAA Mega Champion was determined and in 2008 the first ever AAA World Mini-Estrella Champion was crowned. Of the fifteen main events to date six have been a steel cage elimination match under Apuesta rules.

For the first time in sixteen years, Verano de Escándalo did not take place in 2012 as Triplemanía XX was moved to August from its usual position in June. In 2013, Triplemanía XXI was moved back to June, but Verano de Escándalo still did not take place. After a two-year break, the event returned in 2014. No event was held in 2016.

Dates, venues and main events

References